Roshaun Omar Stuart Williams (born 3 September 1998), known as Ro-Shaun Williams, is an English professional footballer who plays as a defender for Doncaster Rovers.

Early and personal life
Williams was born in Manchester, and grew up in Whalley Range. In 2014 he said that Ryan Giggs was his hero. At the age of 15 he broke Darren Campbell's 100-metre schoolboy sprinting record.

Club career

Manchester United
Williams began his football career at Fletcher Moss Rangers, he then moved to Manchester United at the age of nine, joining the club at his mother's insistence so that he stopped kicking a football around inside the house. He was linked with a loan move away from the club at the start of the 2018–19 season, but joined the club's pre-season tour of the United States. Later that season he spent time training with the first-team whilst still playing for their youth team.

Shrewsbury Town
He signed for Shrewsbury Town in January 2019. He made his professional debut on 9 February 2019 in a 1–1 EFL League One draw away to Bristol Rovers.

In April 2021 Williams said he was hoping to soon hit the 100 game milestone for Shrewsbury.

On 12 May 2021 it was announced that he would leave Shrewsbury at the end of the season, following the expiry of his contract.

Doncaster Rovers
On 18 June 2021 it was announced that Williams would transfer to Doncaster Rovers on 1 July 2021, following the expiry of his Shrewsbury contract, after he signed a two-year deal.

International career
He has represented England at under-17, under-18, and under-19 youth international levels. He is eligible for Grenada through his mother who was born on the island in Victoria.

Career statistics

References

1998 births
Living people
Footballers from Manchester
English footballers
English sportspeople of Grenadian descent
England youth international footballers
Association football defenders
Fletcher Moss Rangers F.C. players
Manchester United F.C. players
Shrewsbury Town F.C. players
Doncaster Rovers F.C. players
English Football League players
Black British sportspeople